The Voice of Roma is an advocacy and human rights group, founded in 1996, for Roma people based in America, with projects across the US and Europe, most notably in Kosovo.

Publishing
VOR have published a number of pamphlets by activist Paul Polansky.

Broadcasting
They are running a Romany language radio station from Belgrade called  "Khrlo e Romengo" – "Voice of Roma",

Board
According to their website, the current board is:

Board of Directors
Sani Rifati, President		
Bruce Cochran
Kristin Raeesi		 		
Carol Silverman, PhD	
Petra Gelbart
Merrilyn Joyce

VOR International Advisory Board 
Enisa Eminova 
Danny Fryer
Ian Hancock
Marie Pierre Lahaye  
Rev. Richard Ramsey
Dragan Ristic 
Dusan Ristic

References
Voice of Roma
Act on Line
Romove
The Volunteer Centre
Happy Feet Travels
Europa World

Human rights organizations based in the United States
Romani rights
Ethnic organizations based in the United States
Charities based in California
Romani advocacy
Romani in the United States